The Orient Square (officially The Orient Square Building or Orient Square IT Center, acronym: OSB or use as a code: OS) is a first-class, high-rise and tallest building along Ortigas Center's main road, F. Ortigas Jr. Avenue (known as Emerald Avenue) in Pasig, Philippines. It rises 160 metres from ground level to roof, and is currently the 7th tallest complete building in Pasig, and the 76th tallest building in the Philippines. The building has 38 levels above ground, and 7 basement levels. It will be a mixed-use building, both office and residential. Orient Square Building is currently one of the modern landmarks in Ortigas Center because of its architectural design and its one-of-a-kind curtain wall that glitters at night from the lights inside the building because of its transparency. The Philippine Economic Zone Authority (PEZA) declared it an Information Technology Building in January 2006.

The building has a 6-level concrete podium as its base, while its main body is fully clad with aluminium unitized curtain wall. It has a distinctive design of having multiple corners, especially on the top floors, making it easily recognizable among the buildings in Ortigas Center.

Location
The building stands along F. Ortigas Jr. Avenue, formerly known as Emerald Avenue. At the back of the building is Ruby Street, and is within the Ortigas Center central business district. It is a near blocks from other major office and residential buildings, hotels (Discovery Suites and Oakwood Premier), bars (Metrowalk and El Pueblo de Manila) and restaurants (El Pueblo de Manila) in the area, as well as large shopping malls (The Podium, SM Megamall, St. Francis Square, Robinsons Galleria and Shangri-La Plaza) and other major landmarks.

The front of the building facing to the east, which lies F. Ortigas Jr. Avenue and Taipan Place. It serves the main lobby of the building. At the back lies Ruby Street facing to the west, it also serves the basement car parking entrance and exit.

Amenities and features
 Building Features
Its features include a fully unitized curtain wall, a computerized and comprehensive building and facility management, centralized cooling system with individual control, powerful communication facilities using fiber optics and digital technology and provision for LAN/DATA and efficient lift management. The building use as office, commercial and residential use.
 Building Amenities
Its amenities include 7-level basements for vehicle parking, 12 high-speed elevators, including two below-ground elevators and one full-speed service lift, also has 6-level concrete podium as its base, helipad on the rooftop, skylounge and observatory near at the top, function rooms, main lobby, security gates, convenient store, food and bake shop, and banks. The building has also its own food court and restaurant area located at 6th floor. Just outside the building crossing Ruby Street, located some of high-end, first-class restaurants, bars and fast-food chains. Daiichi Properties' the Taipan Place which located across F. Ortigas Jr. Avenue, just in front of the building, is the sister building of Orient Square.

Major tenants
 Amihan Global Strategies (formerly known as Workforce Systems Inc.)
 Aventis Pharma
 Axis Global Interactive
 Banco de Oro
 BlastAsia Inc.
 China State Construction Engineering
 Citibank
Cognitif Incorporated
 E-Pacific Contact Global Center
 Emerson Electric Company
empleyado Incorporated
Exclusive Networks - PH Inc.
 Exist Global Strategies Inc.
 GAITCON (Global Advanced IT Connections)
 Global Staff Connections
 ExxonMobil
 InfoComm Communications Network
 Inform Group
 InventAsia Limited
 Res Werkes Phils., Inc.
 Leverage Systems Technologies
 Neville Clarke Phils
 NexTel Communications
 Orchid CyberTech Services (TPG Telecom)
 Pan De Manila
 PIMS Company
 Prescribe Limited
 ResWerkes Phils., Inc.
 Sensomed Philippines, Inc.
 7-Eleven
 Seven Seven Global Services Inc.
 SMEC International Pty Ltd
 Sodexho Pass Incorporated
 Standard Chartered Bank
 Sunlife of Canada
 TÜV SÜD Phils, Inc.
 VeriFone Global Development Phils.
 Vertiv
 Waveminds Global Solutions Limited Inc.

See also
 List of tallest buildings in Metro Manila

References

External links 
Orient Square Building at Wikimapia Forums
Orient Square Building Daiichi Properties Inc.

Skyscrapers in Ortigas Center
Skyscraper office buildings in Metro Manila
Office buildings completed in 1999
Residential skyscrapers in Metro Manila
Residential buildings completed in 1999
1999 establishments in the Philippines